= Drunk with Love =

- Directed by: Esmail Kushan
- Written by: Syamak Yasami
- Produced by: Esmail Kushan
- Cinematography: Boris Matayof
- Production company: Pars Film
- Release date: 18 September 1951
- Running time: 120 minutes
- Country: Iran
- Language: Persian

Drunk with Love (Persian: Masty eshq) is a 1951 Iranian drama film directed by Esmail Kushan.

== Cast ==
- Alexander Bijanian
- Hossein Daneshavar
- Ma'soomeh Khakyar
- Mehdi Maysaghieh
- Habibollah Morad
- Bahram Siar

== Bibliography ==
- Mohammad Ali Issari. Cinema in Iran, 1900-1979. Scarecrow Press, 1989.
